Kentucky American Water is an investor-owned utility company in the Commonwealth of Kentucky serving more than half a million people in portions of 14 counties. Kentucky American Water is a subsidiary of American Water, headquartered in Camden, New Jersey.

The company started life as the Lexington Hydraulic and Manufacturing Company in 1882, became the Lexington Water Company in 1922, and took its current name in 1973.

References

Bloomberg
TPO Magazine
Businesswire

External links
American Water.com: company history
American Water.com: About us
Press Room
Investor Relations

Water companies of the United States
RWE
Companies listed on the New York Stock Exchange
American companies established in 1886
Companies based in Camden, New Jersey